Jamel Anthony Wallace (born August 12, 1987), is a retired American soccer player.

Career

Youth and College
Wallace played 16 games as a freshman with San Diego State Aztecs. He played 90 minutes in 5 consecutive games and started all 19 games as a Junior. He played 18 games as a senior, scoring 3 goals and 1 assist and scored the game-winning goal against California.

Professional
Wallace was drafted in the fourth round (59th overall) of the 2010 MLS SuperDraft by Seattle Sounders FC, but was not offered a professional contract by the team.

He signed for the Kitsap Pumas of the USL Premier Development League in April 2010. After one season with Kitsap, Wallace signed with Richmond Kickers of the USL Pro league on March 23, 2011. He made his professional debut on May 7, coming on as a last-minute substitute in a game against the Wilmington Hammerheads.

In August 2014, Wallace signed for Armenian Premier League side FC Ararat Yerevan alongside fellow Los Angeles Misioneros teammates Bryan de la Fuente and Christian King. Wallace left Ararat Yarevan in February 2015 by mutual consent.

After Soccer
After returning from Armenia Wallace became a branch manager for AccentCare.

Career statistics

References

1987 births
Living people
American soccer players
San Diego State Aztecs men's soccer players
Kitsap Pumas players
Richmond Kickers players
Wilmington Hammerheads FC players
LA Laguna FC players
FC Ararat Yerevan players
Association football midfielders
Seattle Sounders FC draft picks
USL League Two players
USL Championship players
Soccer players from Texas